Gusevo is the name of several rural localities in Russia.

 Gusevo, Bashkortostan, a village in the Gusevsky Rural Settlement of Abzelilovsky District
Gusevo, Kaliningrad Oblast, a settlement in the Mozyrsky Rural Settlement of Pravdinsky District
 Gusevo, Oryol Oblast, a village in the Bortnovskoye Rural Settlement of Zalegoshchensky District